XHX-TDT is the television call sign for the Televisa television station on virtual channel 2.1 in both Monterrey, Nuevo León and Saltillo, Coahuila. The station carries the Las Estrellas network.

History 
The first television station in Monterrey, XHNL-TV, came to air on channel 10 September 1, 1955, with a presidential report from President Adolfo Ruiz Cortines. XHNL broadcast from studios in two rooms of the Hotel El Mirador and a transmitter on Cerro del Topo Chico and carried a wide variety of films and TV series on film. Not long after it started, it raised its power and its antenna height and changed its callsign to XHX-TV. In 1958, the opening of Televicentro de Monterrey allowed for local program production to begin.

The station became a Las Estrellas transmitter in 1985.

Digital television 

On September 24, 2015, XHX shut off its analog signal on analog channel 10 (9 in Saltillo); its digital signal on UHF channel 23 remained.

References

External links
 Canal de las Estrellas

Las Estrellas transmitters
Spanish-language television stations in Mexico
Television channels and stations established in 1958
Television stations in Monterrey
1958 establishments in Mexico